Ivan Cesar (9 May 1936 – 26 November 1993) was a Croatian politician.

In 1990 he was the founder and the leader of Croatian Christian Democratic Party (HKDS).

In the 1992 presidential elections in Croatia he ran as a candidate, finishing 7th. This, and failure of HKDS to enter Croatian Parliament led to HKDS uniting with Croatian Democratic Party (HDS) into a new party called the Croatian Christian Democratic Union.

References

1936 births
1993 deaths
Candidates in the 1992 Croatian presidential election
Croatian Christian Democratic Party politicians
Croatian Christian Democratic Union politicians
Government ministers of Croatia
Burials at Mirogoj Cemetery